Querner is a German surname. Notable people with the surname include:

 Curt Querner (1904–1976), German painter
 Rudolf Querner (1893-1945), German SS functionary

German-language surnames